Blepharomastix bademusalis is a moth in the family Crambidae. It was described by William Schaus in 1924. It is found in Peru.

The wingspan is about 23 mm. The forewings are white, the costa suffused with buffy brown. There is a faint buffy-brown spot in the cell. The postmedial line is faint and buffy brown and there are brown terminal points. The hindwings are white with a faint postmedial line, as well as an interrupted sayal (the color of sackcloth) -brown terminal line.

References

Moths described in 1924
Blepharomastix